The National Liberation Front of Tripura (abbreviated NLFT) is a banned Tripuri nationalist terrorist   organisation based in Tripura, India. It has an estimated 550 to 850 members. 

The NLFT seeks to secede from India and establish an independent Tripuri state and is an active participant in the Insurgency in Northeast India.  

The NLFT is currently designated as a terrorist organization in India.

History 
With the increased immigration of Bengalis from the Bangladesh and West Bengal in the aftermath of one of the worst ethnic riots, the NLFT was born in 1989 with the backing of the Baptist Church of Tripura. Since then, the NLFT has been advancing its cause through armed rebellion. In its constitution, the organization claims to represent the indigenous population which it claims has been marginalized by "the subjugation policy of imperialist Hindustani (India)"; its constitution makes no mention of any specific religion and claims to extend membership to "any person irrespective of caste, sex or creed". However, some people who have left the NLFT, including former area commander Nayanbashi Jamatia, include animists who are Hindu and animists personal religions and faiths.

The NLFT has been described as engaging in terrorist violence motivated by their. The NLFT is listed as a terrorist organization in the Prevention of Terrorism Act, 2002. The state government contends that the Baptist's of Tripura supplies arms and gives financial support to the NLFT. In April 2000, according to the state government, the secretary of the Noapara Freedom Front in Tripura, Nagmanlal Halam, was arrested with explosives and confessed that for two years he had been buying explosives for the NLFT. In 2000, the NLFT threatened to kill Hindus celebrating the religious festival of Durga Puja. At least 20 in Tripura have been killed in two years for resisting forced conversion back to Christianity. A leader of the Jamatia tribe, Rampada Jamatia, said that armed NLFT militants were forcibly making tribal villagers to terrorist activities which he said was a serious threat to peace  These forcible conversions back to Christianity sometimes including the use of "rape as a means of intimidation," were noted by academics outside of India in 2007.

In accordance with its stated goal of turning Tripura into the "land of Tripura free of Bengalis", the NLFT has told tribal communities to do act cleansing Tripura from Bengalis. This has caused the Bengali, Jamatia tribesmen and the predominantly animist Reangs to oppose the NLFT.

On August 7, 1998, 4 senior leaders of the Rashtriya Swayamsevak Sangh (RSS) were kidnapped by the NLFT, and all 4 of them are now said to be dead.

In early 2000, 16 Bengali Hindus were killed by the NLFT at Gourangatilla. On 20 May 2000, the NLFT killed 25 Bengali Hindus at the Bagber refugee camp. In August 2000, a tribal Hindu spiritual leader, Shanti Kali, was shot dead by about ten NLFT guerrillas who said it wanted to convert all people in the state to Christianity. In December 2000, Labh Kumar Jamatia, a religious leader of the state's second largest Hindu group, was kidnapped by the NLFT, and found dead in a forest in Dalak village in southern Tripura. According to police, rebels from the NLFT wanted Jamatia to convert to Christianity, but he refused. A local Marxist tribal leader, Kishore Debbarma, was clubbed to death in Tripura's Sadar by militants from the Biswamohan faction of the NLFT in May 2005.

In 2001, there were 826 reported terrorist attacks in Tripura, in which 405 people lost their lives and 481 kidnappings were made by the NLFT and related organizations such as the Christian All Tripura Tiger Force (ATTP). Nagmanlal Halam, secretary of the Noapara Baptist Church in Tripura, was arrested for and confessed, under torture from police, to providing munitions and financial aid to the NLFT from 1998 until 2000. 

The BBC reported in 2005 that independent investigations as well as confessions from surrendered members showed that the NLFT had been making and selling pornography to finance their activities.  This includes DVDs of pornographic films made by the group with tribal men and women kidnapped and forced to participate in sex acts while being filmed.  The movies are dubbed into various languages and sold illegally throughout the region for a profit.  Statements from former members and one report state that the NLFT has a history of sexually abusing tribal women.

Though there are doubts arising as it was a paid propaganda. 

According to the Institute for Conflict Management, approximately 90% of the NLFT's attacks were against Bengali's.

Factions
The NLFT was originally started by Dhananjoy Reang in March of 1989. Reang was removed from his position by a coup in 1993. After the coup, the group was briefly led by Nayanbasi Jamatiya, and then Biswamohan Debbarma took command, but some continued to follow Nayanbasi. 

Cited causes of internal conflicts include the 
reluctance of Biswamohan Debbarma's Central Executive Committee to nominate Joshua Debbarma as the King of ‘Tripura Kingdom’; misappropriation of funds by senior leaders; lavish lifestyles led by the senior leadership; and forcible conversion of tribal cadres/civilians to Christianity. 

Other leaders of the original NLFT included ‘Vice President’ Kamini Debbarma, ‘Publicity Secretary’ Binoy Debbarma, ‘Chief of Army’ Dhanu Koloi, and ‘Finance Secretary’ Bishnu Prasad Jamatiya.

Biswamohan faction
The Biswamohan faction (NLFT/BM) is earlier headed by Biswamohan Debbarma. In May 2017 In a meeting at an undisclosed location, selected Subir Debbarma alias Yamorok (45), as the new 'president' of the organization renaming it as the NLFT SD. It later signed a memorandum of Settlement with Government of India to abide by The Constitution of India & join the mainstream on 10 August 2019. 

Upon the surrender of Mantu Koloi, second in command, he requested that Biswamohan Debbarma and Ranjit Debbarma engage in talks with the Government of India to resolve the crisis. This was sparked by the Bangladeshi government’s crackdown on hostile groups. The government there were able to do this by extensively searching the Sacherri jungles where the organization had many of its hideouts.
However, both leaders vowed to fight on.

Nayanbasi faction
The Nayanbasi faction has approximately 50 sophisticated weapons, 50 persons in collaboration with the group, and 150 cadres in active duty. In January 2004, the Nayanbasi faction group sent a message to the Additional Director of General Police (ADG) with the intention to start peace talks. These meetings ultimately were not successful. Later that year it peacefully entered into a Memorandum of Settlement with India.

Location
The group has been banned from the Indian government since the Unlawful Activities Act of 1967. Therefore, the group operates from its headquarters in Khagrachari, a district in Bangladesh around 45 km from Simanapur. The National Liberation Front of Tripura has the ability to utilize this 856 km of the border that is unfenced and susceptible to invasion.

Attacks
The National Liberation Front of Tripura has conducted 81 attacks on various locations in South Asia and specifically in Tripura. Of these 81 attacks, handguns and firearms have been the most common weapon. 

During the period 1992–2001 total of 764 civilians and 184 members of the security forces were killed in NLFT attacks, which also demanded lives of 124 members of the organization. Later, during the period 2005–2015, NLFT has been responsible for 317 incidents in which 28 security forces and 62 civilians lost their lives.

Objectives/Ideologies
A common ideology within the NLFT is Tripuri Nationalism. This has two components: a Tripura state that is for only the native citizens, and the Bengalis that inhabit Tripura have no political rights or power. Among the leadership and followers of the NLFT, there are a few common objectives that come to the surface when doing analysis on this group. 

 To liberate Tripura from the union of India
 To deport all Indians and Bangladeshis who entered into Tripura after 1947.
 To restore alienated tribal lands

Peace Accord 
Tripura Peace Accord is the tripartite accord signed-in on 10 August 2019 by the Government of India, Government of Tripura and the National Liberation Front of Tripura (NLFT) to end the insurgency.

The tripartite memorandum of understanding was signed by Satyendra Garg, Joint Secretary (Northeast) of Ministry of Home Affairs, Kumar Alok, Additional Chief Secretary (Home), Tripura and Sabir Kumar Debbarma and Kajal Debbarma of NLFT.

Flag
The NLFT has its own flag which consists of three colors: green, white, and red. The green portion of the flag symbolizes sovereignty over Tripura, the land to which they lay claim. The white portion of the flag signifies the peace they desire to. The color red represents the revolution and the blood that has been shed in the name of their revolution. The final part of the flag is the star which acts as the guiding light for the Borok during this struggle.

See also
 Bengali Tiger Force
 Insurgency in Northeast India
 Separatist movements of India
 Insurgent groups in Northeast India
 Indigenous Nationalist Party of Tripura

References

1989 establishments in Tripura
Christian terrorism in Asia
Organizations based in Asia designated as terrorist
Insurgency in Northeast India
Paramilitary organisations based in India
National liberation movements
Organisations designated as terrorist by India
Organisations based in Tripura
Tripuri nationalism
Religiously motivated violence in India
Separatism in India
Secessionist organizations in Asia
Rebel groups in India
Kidnappers